Giorgi IV Dadiani (died 1715) was Prince of Mingrelia from 1691 to 1704 and from 1710 to 1715. Giorgi's accession to rulership, following his ouster of the First House of Dadiani, inaugurated Mingrelia's second Dadiani dynasty, stemming from the Chikovani clan. Giorgi was also known as Lipartiani (ლიპარტიანი) by virtue of having Salipartiano as a fief from 1682 to 1715. Giorgi was actively involved in a series of civil wars that plagued the western Georgian polities. He was eventually deposed by his own son and placed under house arrest.

Rise to power 
Giorgi was a son of Katsia Chikovani, the lord of Lechkhumi by his wife Mzekhatun, daughter of Prince Levan III Dadiani. Under Levan III Dadiani, Katsia attained to lordship of Salipartiano, a key fiefdom in Mingrelia, and exerted significant influence in the principality. Giorgi succeeded on Katsia's death as lord of Salipartiano in 1682. By placing Levan IV Dadiani, Levan III's natural son, on the throne of Mingrelia against the rival claims of Giorgi Gurieli, Prince of Guria, in 1691, Giorgi became Mingrelia's de facto ruler. He embarked on a relentless campaign to eliminate any opposition to his authority by killings and harassment and enriched himself by slave-trading. In 1691, he forced Levan IV Dadiani to abdicate and made himself prince of Mingrelia, assuming the title and surname of Dadiani.

Civil war in Imereti 
Giorgi Dadiani attempted to make his positions more secure by forging an alliance with the Imeretian prince Giorgi-Malakia Abashidze, who usurped the crown of Imereti in 1702. Dadiani married Abashidze's daughter Tamar, having repudiating his earlier union with Princess Sevdia Mikeladze, the mother of his several children. Dadiani then proceeded, with the instigation of his new wife, to confiscate estates of the Mikeladze family, who lent support to Abashidze's arch-rival, George VII of Imereti. Amid ongoing power struggle, Dadiani's own brother Iese, lord of Lechkhumi, married to Giorgi VII's aunt Mariam, switched sides, but this cost him his possessions in 1703. In 1703, the Ottomans mounted a major expedition to consolidate their authority in western Georgia. Dadiani pledged loyalty to Abashidze and resisted an Ottoman force landed in Mingrelia. The principality held out, but Ottoman soldiers were left to garrison the maritime towns of Poti and Anaklia.

Downfall 
The Abashidze and Dadiani power was draining away. In 1704, Giorgi Dadiani abdicated as prince of Mingrelia in favor of his elder son by his ex-wife Mikeladze, Katsia. To his younger son, Bezhan, he gave Lechkhumi and another, Gabriel, was made bishop of Chqondidi. Giorgi himself retired to his patrimonial fiefdom of Salipartiano, but maintained significant influence on his sons until 1709, when Katsia and Bezhan, who never forgave Giorgi for divorcing their mother, sided with King George VII of Imereti against the Abashidze–Lipartiani alliance. Giorgi fled to Abkhazia and returned to Mingrelia after the death of Katsia in 1710. He was, thus, able to resume his rule in Mingrelia and effected rapprochement with King George VII, only to defect him again in 1711. Giorgi's renewed principate was, however, challenged by his younger son, Bezhan, who enjoyed the king's support. In 1715, Bezhan invited Giorgi for family reconciliation, but had him disarmed and deposed. Giorgi was confined by Bezhan to house arrest and persuaded to remarry Sevdia Mikeladze, with whom Giorgi lived until his death in 1715.

Family 
By his first wife Sevdia, daughter of Prince Otia Mikeladze, Giorgi had six children:
 Katsia I Dadiani, Prince of Mingrelia (1704–1710);
 Bezhan Dadiani, Prince of Mingrelia (1715–1728); 
 Manuchar Dadiani, prince;
 Anton, metropolitan bishop;
 Gabriel, archbishop of Chqondidi;
 Mzekhatun, wife of Prince George of Imereti;

Giorgi had no children of his second and third marriages, respectively, with Tamar Abashidze in 1701 and Tamar, daughter of Prince Mamia Gurieli, in 1710.

References 

1715 deaths
House of Dadiani
17th-century people from Georgia (country)
18th-century people from Georgia (country)